The Darlinghurst Gaol is a former Australian prison located in Darlinghurst, New South Wales. The site is bordered by Darlinghurst Road, Burton and Forbes streets, with entrances on Forbes and Burton Streets. The heritage-listed building, predominantly designed by New South Wales Colonial Architect Mortimer Lewis, was closed in 1914 and has subsequently been repurposed to house the National Art School.

History

Construction commenced with pegging out by Francis Greenway in 1821. The Darlinghurst Gaol wall began in 1822 and finished in 1824 using convict labour, but due to a lack of funds, the site sat empty for 12 years. Construction of the rest of the complex did not begin until 1836, with completion of some of the cell blocks in 1840. The gaol was ready for occupation a year later, with the first prisoners occupying the gaol on 7 June 1841.

The gaol was finally completed in 1885. The main material used for construction of the gaol is Sydney sandstone, cut into large blocks by convicts. Convict markings on the blocks are visible along the upper half of the wall on Darlinghurst Road. A tall circular chapel stands in the middle of the site, around which are sited the six rectangular cellblocks in a radial fashion.

Australian poet Henry Lawson spent time incarcerated here during some of the turbulent years of his life and described the gaol as Starvinghurst Gaol due to meagre rations given to the inmates.  The site is now open to the public as The National Art School. The last hanging at the gaol was in 1907.

Hangings were open to public viewing throughout several decades. People would gather at the front gate of the gaol in Forbes Street, and the condemned would be brought out on a platform built above the gaol gate. The public executioner Alexander Green lived for a time in a hut outside the eastern wall of the gaol, would then leave his house to the jeers and catcalls of the gathering crowd, enter the prison and do his job. Seventy-six people were hanged at Darlinghurst Gaol, but most of them met their demise on the scaffold inside the gaol in a corner of E-wing. Among those who met their demise at the end of a rope were bushranger Andrew George Scott, better known as Captain Moonlite, in 1880, and the last woman to be hanged in NSW, Louisa Collins, in 1889.

Modern-day use
The site was transferred in 1921 to the New South Wales Department of Education, which adapted the building for use as the East Sydney Technical College. The National Art School was established in 1922 and is now the sole occupant of the site.

The Darlinghurst Road side of the Gaol, (commonly known as "the wall") was for many years a popular place for male prostitutes to offer their services.

Notable prisoners

 Thomas and John Clarkebushrangers from the upper Shoalhaven in south-east New South Wales, hanged on 25 June 1867.
 Louisa Collinsthe last woman to hang in New South Wales.
 Sir George Dibbs Colonial politician gaoled for a year in 1880 for slander relating to a widely reported adultery case. He was perceived by the electorate as the underdog, and his political popularity was restored.
 Albert Thomas Dryermedical doctor  and founder of the Irish National Association of Australasia.
 John DunnAustralian bushranger, member of Ben Hall's gang, hanged in the gaol on 19 March 1866.
 Frank GardinerAustralian bushranger and mastermind of the Forbes gold escort robbery at Eugowra on 15 June 1862 (sentenced to 32 years, but pardoned early).
 Jimmy Governorupon whom Thomas Keneally based his novel, The Chant of Jimmie Blacksmith.
 Henry LawsonAustralian writer and poet.
 Henry James O'FarrellIrish Australian attempted political assassin.
 Andrew George Scottknown as Captain Moonlite, Irish-Australian bushranger.
 John Vanea bushranger who was member of Ben Hall's gang.

See also

Punishment in Australia
List of Australian psychiatric institutions

References

Further reading

External links
 National Art School – The school occupying the site today
 reference and article (CC-by-sa) in the Dictionary of Sydney
 State Library of New South Wales – Discover Collections – Halls of Justice
  [CC-By-SA]

Defunct prisons in Sydney
Government buildings completed in 1885
Infrastructure completed in 1885
Sandstone buildings in Australia
Mortimer Lewis buildings
Darlinghurst, New South Wales
New South Wales State Heritage Register
1841 establishments in Australia